Lirobittium quadrifilatum is a species of small sea snail, a marine gastropod mollusk in the family Cerithiidae.

References

Cerithiidae
Gastropods described in 1864